Liliane Gaschet (born 16 March 1962 in Fort-de-France, Martinique) is a French athlete who specialises in the 100 and 200 meters. Gaschet competed in the women's 100 and 200 meters and also the 4 x 100 meter relay at the 1984 Summer Olympics.

External links 

1962 births
Living people
Sportspeople from Fort-de-France
Martiniquais athletes
French female sprinters
Olympic athletes of France
French people of Martiniquais descent
Athletes (track and field) at the 1984 Summer Olympics
Mediterranean Games gold medalists for France
Mediterranean Games silver medalists for France
Athletes (track and field) at the 1983 Mediterranean Games
European Athletics Championships medalists
Mediterranean Games medalists in athletics
Olympic female sprinters
20th-century French women